Giorgi Chantouria (born January 23, 1989) is a former tennis player from Georgia, who played on the ITF Futures tournaments and Davis Cup. 

In the 2007 Davis Cup he played against future world number one tennis player Novak Djokovic. Djokovic led 6–1, 5–0 when Chantouria retired.

References
  Davis Cup 2007: Serbia - Georgia

External links
 
  Chantouria profile on tennisexplorer.com

Male tennis players from Georgia (country)
1989 births
Living people
Sportspeople from Tbilisi